Owen Story (born 3 August 1984 in Burton upon Trent) is an English footballer who plays for  side Melton Town, where he plays as a forward.

Playing career
Story began his career as a trainee with Rushden & Diamonds, turning professional in February 2003. He made his league debut, as a substitute for Duane Darby, on 20 September 2003, a 2–1 defeat away to AFC Bournemouth and played five more times for the Rushden first team, all as substitute, before leaving at the end of that season.

He subsequently played for Team Bath before joining Torquay United in January 2005. He played just twice for Torquay before being released.

On his release, he returned to Bath, joining Bath City in April 2005 from where he joined Hinckley United later that season.

He played over 100 games for Hinckley, in a number of roles from right midfield, left midfield, striker and even right back.

He left to join Redditch United in 2008.

On 14 November 2018 Barwell confirmed that Owen Sory had left the club to join fellow Southern League Premier Central side Bedworth United.

References

External links

1984 births
Living people
Sportspeople from Burton upon Trent
English footballers
Association football midfielders
Leicester Nirvana F.C. players
Rushden & Diamonds F.C. players
Torquay United F.C. players
Bath City F.C. players
Hinckley United F.C. players
Redditch United F.C. players
Brackley Town F.C. players
Team Bath F.C. players
King's Lynn F.C. players
Leamington F.C. players
Barwell F.C. players
Bedworth United F.C. players
Melton Town F.C. players